Josh Cooper (born January 8, 1989) is a former American football wide receiver who played in the National Football League.

Early years
Cooper attended and played football at Mustang High School in Mustang, Oklahoma.
During his senior season in high school, Cooper caught 81 passes for 1,328 yards and had 15 touchdowns while the team went 10–2. On defense, Cooper accounted for 84 tackles and 6 interceptions. He also kicked eight successful field goals.

College career
Josh Cooper played college football at Oklahoma State University. He was a redshirt in 2007. In 2008 as a freshman, Cooper had 2 catches for 10 ten yards, and 0 touchdowns. In 2009 as a sophomore, Cooper had 20 receptions for 234 yards, and 1 touchdown. In 2010 as a junior, Cooper had 68 catches, 736 receiving yards, and five touchdowns ranking second behind eventual first round draft choice Justin Blackmon.
Cooper also returned punts in college, averaging 9.6 yards per return for his career. He returned 1 for a touchdown.

Professional career

Pre-Draft Combines
225 lb. bench press repetitions: 11 
40 yard dash: 4.65 
20 yard dash: 2.64 
10 yard dash: 1.58 
Vertical jump: 31.5" 
Broad jump: 9'07" 
20 yard shuttle: 4.35 
3-cone drill: 7.12

Cleveland Browns
Cooper signed with the Cleveland Browns as an undrafted free agent after the 2012 NFL Draft. He thought he'd have a good chance to stay with Cleveland because he was a favorite target of QB Brandon Weeden, having built a chemistry from when they played together as part of Oklahoma State Cowboys football. He was wrong. He was released on May 19, 2014.

Minnesota Vikings
The Minnesota Vikings signed Cooper on June 13, 2014. He was waived on July 25, 2014.

References

1989 births
Living people
People from Mustang, Oklahoma
Players of American football from Oklahoma
American football wide receivers
Oklahoma State Cowboys football players
Cleveland Browns players
Minnesota Vikings players